Fenton Township is a township in Kossuth County, Iowa, in the United States.

History
Fenton Township was organized in 1873.

References

Townships in Kossuth County, Iowa
Townships in Iowa
1873 establishments in Iowa
Populated places established in 1873